The 1988 East German Indoor Athletics Championships was the 25th edition of the national championship in indoor track and field for East Germany. It was held on 26–27 February at the Sporthalle Aktivist in Senftenberg. A total of 29 events (16 for men and 13 for women) were contested over the two-day competition.

Results

Men

Women

References

 
 
 Leichtathletik Historie. Sport Komplett. Retrieved 2019-07-13.

East German Indoor Athletics Championships
East German Indoor Athletics Championships
East German Indoor Athletics Championships
East German Indoor Athletics Championships
Senftenberg
Sport in Brandenburg
20th century in Brandenburg